Weewerk, stylized as (weewerk), is an independent folk, roots, bluegrass, country record label and artist-management company based in Toronto, Ontario, Canada. It was founded in 2002 as an art-and-music salon series in the apartment of Teenage USA Recordings partner Phil Klygo and artist-curator Germaine Koh. Klygo was Festival Director of Canadian Music Week from 2001 to 2007.

Weewerk has released albums from Great Lake Swimmers, Elliott Brood, United Steel Workers of Montreal, The Barmitzvah Brothers, Barzin, Ox, Two-Minute Miracles, The Burning Hell, Filly & The Flops, Proof of Ghosts, Jenny Omnichord, Don Brownrigg, FemBots, Canteen Knockout, Art Bergmann and The Travelling Band.

The label's name is a play on the name of fellow Canadian record label Nettwerk, and was named for the small apartment space in which the company was founded.

Discography
 Great Lake Swimmers, Great Lake Swimmers
 The Barmitzvah Brothers, Mr. Bones' Walk-In Closet
 Elliott Brood, Tin Type
 Great Lake Swimmers, Bodies and Minds
 Barzin, My Life in Rooms
 United Steel Workers of Montreal, Broken Trucks and Bottles
 Great Lake Swimmers, Hands in Dirty Ground
 Ox, American Lo Fi
 Great Lake Swimmers, Ongiara
 United Steel Workers of Montreal, Kerosene and Coal
 The Two-Minute Miracles, Volume 3.5: Rats
 The Two-Minute Miracles, Volume IV: The Lions of Love
 The Barmitzvah Brothers, Let's Express Our Motives
 The Burning Hell, Happy Birthday
 Harmonica, Miaow, Miaow...BARK!
 Proof of Ghosts, Proof of Ghosts
 Jenny Omnichord, Cities of Gifts and Ghosts
 The Burning Hell, Tick, Tock
 Don Brownrigg, Wander Songs
 Canteen Knockout, Navajo Steel
 The Two-Minute Miracles, Volume I (re-release)
 The Travelling Band, The Redemption of Mr. Tom
 Various Artists, (weewerk) is 6!
 FemBots, Calling Out
 The Burning Hell/Jenny Omnichord, Split 7"
 Great Lake Swimmers, Song Sung Blue
 Jon-Rae Fletcher, Oh, Maria
 United Steel Workers of Montreal, Three on the Tree
 The Burning Hell, Baby
 Great Lake Swimmers/Audiotransparent, Split 7"
 Ox, Burnout
 Filly and the Flops, Filly and the Flops
 Canteen Knockout, Broken Down Town

Label compilations 

On October 14, 2008 (weewerk) released (weewerk) is 6!, a compilation to celebrate their sixth anniversary.

See also 
 List of record labels

References

External links
 Weewerk

Canadian independent record labels
Record labels established in 2002
Indie rock record labels
Companies based in Toronto
2002 establishments in Ontario